Walter Jackson Freeman III (January 30, 1927 – April 24, 2016), was an American biologist, theoretical neuroscientist and philosopher who conducted research in rabbits' olfactory perception, using EEG. Based on a theoretical framework of neurodynamics that draws upon insights from chaos theory, he speculated that the currency of brains is primarily meaning, and only secondarily information.

In "Societies of Brains" and in other writings, Freeman rejected the view that the brain uses representations to enable knowledge and behavior.

Biography and contribution to science 
Walter Freeman was born in Washington, DC. His father was Walter Jackson Freeman II; his great-grandfather was William Williams Keen.

Freeman was a multi-disciplinary scientists, prominent in both, neuroscience and mathematics. He studied physics and mathematics at the Massachusetts Institute of Technology, electronics in the Navy in World War II, philosophy at the University of Chicago, medicine at Yale University, internal medicine at Johns Hopkins, and neuropsychiatry at University of California, Los Angeles. He received his M.D. cum laude in 1954, the Bennett Award from the Society of Biological Psychiatry in 1964, a Guggenheim Fellowship in 1965, the MERIT Award from NIMH in 1990, and the Pioneer Award from the Neural Networks Council of the IEEE in 1992. He was a Professor Emeritus of Neurobiology at University of California, Berkeley. He was also the head of the international advisory council at the Bhaktivedanta Institute for advanced scientific research in consciousness.
 
Freeman was President of the International Neural Network Society in 1994, and is a Life Fellow of the IEEE.  He has authored over 450 articles and 4 books.

In 2008, Freeman proposed that Thomism is the philosophical system explaining cognition that is most compatible with neurodynamics.

Freeman died at his home in Berkeley, California on April 24, 2016 from pulmonary fibrosis, aged 89.
 
A special Theme Issue of the journal Nonlinear Dynamics in Psychology (N 21/4, 2017) was devoted to Freeman's work and theory

Bibliography
 Freeman, Walter. Mass Action in the Nervous System, 1975
 Freeman, Walter. Societies of Brains, 1995
 Freeman, Walter. How Brains Make up Their Minds, 1999
 Freeman, Walter. Neurodynamics, 2000

References

External links
 W.J. Freeman Brain Dynamics

1927 births
2016 deaths
Massachusetts Institute of Technology School of Science alumni
American neuroscientists
University of California, Berkeley faculty
Yale School of Medicine alumni
University of Chicago alumni
University of California, Los Angeles alumni
Johns Hopkins University alumni
Deaths from pulmonary fibrosis
People from Washington, D.C.
Fellow Members of the IEEE